Tricolia elongata is a species of sea snail, a marine gastropod mollusk in the family Phasianellidae.

Description

Distribution
This marine species occurs in the Indian Ocean off southern Mozambique and north-eastern South Africa.

References

 Dautzenberg, Ph. (1929). Mollusques testacés marins de Madagascar. Faune des Colonies Francaises, Tome III
 Robertson, R. (1985). Archaeogastropod biology and the systematics of the genus Tricolia (Trochacea: Tricoliidae) in the Indo-West Pacific. Monographs of Marine Mollusca 3: 1–103. page(s): 21

External links
  T. C. Nangammbi and D. G. Herbert, A new species of pheasant shell from the south-western Indian Ocean (Mollusca: Gastropoda: Vetigastropoda: Phasianellidae: Tricolia), African Invertebrates Vol. 49 (2) pp.  13–19 Pietermaritzburg December, 2008

Phasianellidae
Gastropods described in 1848